Josef Horešovský (born 18 July 1946 in Žilina, Czechoslovakia) is a retired professional ice hockey player who played in the Czechoslovak Extraliga. He played for HC Jihlava and HC Sparta Praha. He won a bronze medal at the 1972 Winter Olympics.

References

External links

1946 births
Czechoslovakia men's national ice hockey team coaches
Olympic ice hockey players of Czechoslovakia
Ice hockey players at the 1968 Winter Olympics
Ice hockey players at the 1972 Winter Olympics
HC Sparta Praha players
HC Dukla Jihlava players
Living people
Medalists at the 1972 Winter Olympics
Olympic bronze medalists for Czechoslovakia
Olympic medalists in ice hockey
People from Kladno District
Sportspeople from the Central Bohemian Region
Czechoslovak ice hockey defencemen
Czech ice hockey defencemen